IMP is an Anglo-Castilian CGI animated series created by Andy Fielding.

Although the show was developed in black and white with a minimalist design, it was produced by Red Kite Animations, developed with Screen 21 and distributed by BRB Internacional where it aired on TVC and consists of 65 episodes of 90 seconds each. IMP has been issued and aired worldwide including Cartoon Network—in which the series was part of Sunday Pants, Disney Channel Japan, and Antena 3 in Spain.

Stephen Mangan and Julian Rhind-Tutt were the voices of IMP and Bob, and they were originally part of the British television program, Green Wing.

Synopsis 
The series took place in the lair of a minor devil known as "The Imp" (Stephen Mangan) and his surroundings. Though the Imp tries and declares himself to be the embodiment of pure evil, he is more childish and petty than truly diabolical, and though he tries to fill the world with sin and suffering, he is far too small and incompetent to make a good job of it.

Other characters in the show include Bob (Julian Rhind-Tutt), the rabbit-eared, highly competent, and rather sardonic caretaker of the lair; the moronic, muscle-bound twin monsters Philippe and Bertrand; a helpful Hand on wheels; Lumen, who, dressed in all white and determined to spread sweetness and light, is regarded by the IMP as his nemesis; the IMP's rival Cat-Thing, who continually seeks to destroy him (unsuccessfully); and the Big Boss (the devil himself, and actually once referred to as "Satan").

Episodes

Reception 
IMP has a score of 7.8 on IMDB.

Awards 
 MIPCOM JR Licensing Winner Challenge (Cannes, 2006)
 Best Short Film for Cars in Circle Talent Competition (UK, 2006)
 Pulcinella Awards Finalist - Cartoons on the Bay (Italy, 2006)

References

External links 
 archived.

2006 Spanish television series debuts
2007 Spanish television series endings
2000s Spanish television series
Spanish children's animated adventure television series
Spanish children's animated comedy television series
Spanish-language television shows
2006 British television series debuts
2007 British television series endings
2000s British animated television series
British children's animated adventure television series
British children's animated comedy television series
English-language television shows